Hamirpur Lok Sabha constituency is one of the four Lok Sabha (parliamentary) constituencies in Himachal Pradesh state in northern India.

Assembly segments
Hamirpur Lok Sabha constituency presently comprises the following 17 Vidhan Sabha (legislative assembly) segments:

Members of Parliament

Election results

2019

2014

2009

Bye Election-2008

Bye Election - 2007

See also
 Hamirpur district
 List of Constituencies of the Lok Sabha

References

Lok Sabha constituencies in Himachal Pradesh
Hamirpur district, Himachal Pradesh
Hamirpur, Himachal Pradesh
Kangra district
Una district
Bilaspur district, Himachal Pradesh
Mandi district